FC Buryatia Ulan-Ude is a Russian football team from Ulan-Ude. It played professionally from 1958 to 2003. It played on the second-highest level (Soviet First League and Russian First Division) in 1958–1962, 1968–1969 and 1992–1993.

Team name and location history
 1958–1960 Lokomotiv Ulan-Ude
 1961–1963 Baikal Ulan-Ude
 1964–1965 Armeyets Ulan-Ude
 1966–1977 Selenga Ulan-Ude
 1978–1983 Lokomotiv Ulan-Ude
 1984–1993 Selenga Ulan-Ude
 1994 Kristall Neryungri
 1995–2003 Selenga Ulan-Ude
 2004–2011 Kommunalnik Ulan-Ude
 2011–2012 FC Buryatia Ulan-Ude
 2012–2016 Selenga Ulan-Ude
 2017–present FC Buryatia Ulan-Ude

External links
  Team history at KLISF

Association football clubs established in 1958
Football clubs in Russia
Sport in Ulan-Ude
1958 establishments in Russia